Anders Gunnar Vilhelm Forsbrand (born 1 April 1961) is a Swedish professional golfer who formerly competed on the European Tour.

Early life
Forsbrand was born in Filipstad, Sweden. He began playing golf at Uddeholm Golf Club, a small club with a 9-hole course in Värmland, Sweden. He later came to represent nearby and bigger Karlstad Golf Club, with an 18-hole course and better practice facilities. His younger brother Vilhelm, born 1970, also became a professional golfer and came to win twice on the Challenge Tour.

Forsbrand won the unofficial 1977 Swedish Youth Championship, Colgate Cup, at his age level (16 years old).

Amateur career
In June 1980, Forsbrand won the Swedish Junior Stroke-play Championship in rainy conditions at Växjö Golf Club. A month later, he was part of the Swedish team, winning the 1981 European Youths' Team Championship in Dusserldorf, Germany.

He represented Sweden at the 1981 European Amateur Team Championship at the Old Course at St Andrews, Scotland. It earned some attention that Forsbrand, in a playoff against Ian Hutcheon, Scotland, hooked his drive, on the first hole on the Old Course, over the 18th fairway out of bounds in to the town.

Professional career
In November 1981, Forsbrand borrowed money from his local club pro, turned professional and traveled by train in four days to the European Tour Qualifying School at the Algarve coast in Portugal. He finished tied 8th, easy qualified for the next season and took the train for another four-day journey back home to Sweden.

His first professional win was the 1982 Swedish PGA Championship, at the time the most important domestic pro tournament before the Swedish Golf Tour was founded two years later.

He played on the European Tour from 1982 until 2003. In 1987, he became the first Swede to win a stroke-play tournament on the European Tour. He won six individual titles on the  European Tour and finished in the top 25 of the Order of Merit seven times, with a best of fourth place in 1992. In 1993, he became the first Swedish golfer to play in all four major championships in the same year.

Forsbrand led Sweden to victories in the two most prestigious professional nation team tournaments, the World Cup and the Dunhill Cup, within three weeks in October and November 1991. Together with Per-Ulrik Johansson, he was close to defend the 1991 World Cup title from Rome, Italy for Sweden in 1992 in Madrid, Spain, but the Swedish team finished second, one shot behind the United States team of Fred Couples and Davis Love III. Forsbrand finished third individually both in 1991 and 1992 (tied).

He had a special penchant for low scoring and (as of end of 2022) still shares the record for the lowest final two rounds in a major championship, scoring 130 in the 1994 Open. His fourth place finish in that championship, did not get the attention it should have earned in Swedish media, as Jesper Parnevik sensationally finished second after losing the tournament on the last hole.

Despite finishing in the top 13 of the European Tour Order of Merit four times, Forsbrand never made the European Ryder Cup team. His best year, 1992, when he finished fourth, was not a Ryder Cup year and he could not continue his good form until the selection of the team the year after. Anyway, in 2004, Bernhard Langer, the European Ryder Cup Captain, named Forsbrand as his vice-captain for the 35th Ryder Cup Matches against the United States at Oakland Hills Country Club, Michigan, U.S., in which the European team had a resounding victory over the U.S. team.

Forsbrand began playing on the European Senior Tour after turning 50 in 2011. In August 2012, he won the SSE Scottish Senior Open, becoming the first Swede to win on the European Senior Tour.

Awards, private life
Forsbrand was three times awarded Swedish Golfer of the Year, male and female, amateur and professional; 1984, 1987 and 1992. In 1984, he was only the second professional, after Charlotte Montgomery the year before, to receive the award and no amateur has since.

In 1992, the three teammates at the 1991 Dunhill Cup victory, Per-Ulrik Johansson, Mats Lanner and Forsbrand was each, by the Swedish Golf Federation, awarded the Golden Club, the highest award for contributions to Swedish golf, as the 11th, 12th and 13th recipients.

In 1998, he was awarded honorary member of the PGA of Sweden.

At the opening of the Swedish Golf Museum in June 2000, he was one of ten players, among names as Annika Sörenstam and Jesper Parnevik, presented as important in the history of Swedish golf.

Forsbrand now lives in Ponte Vedra Beach, Florida, with his wife, Stewart, and their children Alexander and Margaux.

Amateur wins
1980 Swedish Junior Strokeplay Championship

Professional wins (15)

European Tour wins (6)

European Tour playoff record (0–3)

Swedish Golf Tour wins (2)

Other wins (6)

European Senior Tour wins (1)

Results in major championships

CUT = missed the half-way cut (3rd round cut in 1984 Open Championship)
"T" indicates a tie for a place

Summary

Most consecutive cuts made – 5 (1991 Open Championship – 1993 Masters)
Longest streak of top-10s – 1 (three times)

Team appearances
Amateur
Jacques Léglise Trophy (representing the Continent of Europe): 1978 (winners)
European Youths' Team Championship (representing Sweden): 1978, 1980 (winners), 1981
European Amateur Team Championship (representing Sweden): 1981

Professional
Hennessy Cognac Cup (representing Sweden): 1984
World Cup (representing Sweden): 1984, 1985, 1988, 1991 (winners), 1992, 1993
Dunhill Cup (representing Sweden): 1986, 1987, 1988, 1991 (winners), 1992, 1993, 1994
Europcar Cup (representing Sweden): 1986 (winners)
Kirin Cup (representing Europe): 1988

References

External links

Swedish male golfers
European Tour golfers
European Senior Tour golfers
PGA Tour Champions golfers
Sportspeople from Värmland County
People from Filipstad
People from Ponte Vedra Beach, Florida
1961 births
Living people